Gerhard Karl Erich Gentzen (24 November 1909 – 4 August 1945) was a German mathematician and logician. He made major contributions to the foundations of mathematics, proof theory, especially on natural deduction and sequent calculus. He died of starvation in a Soviet prison camp in Prague in 1945, having been interned as a German national after the Second World War.

Life and career
Gentzen was a student of Paul Bernays at the University of Göttingen. Bernays was fired as "non-Aryan" in April 1933 and therefore Hermann Weyl formally acted as his supervisor. Gentzen joined the Sturmabteilung in November 1933 although he was by no means compelled to do so. Nevertheless he kept in contact with Bernays until the beginning of the Second World War. In 1935, he corresponded with Abraham Fraenkel in Jerusalem and was implicated by the Nazi teachers' union as one who "keeps contacts to the Chosen People." In 1935 and 1936, Hermann Weyl, head of the Göttingen mathematics department in 1933 until his resignation under Nazi pressure, made strong efforts to bring him to the Institute for Advanced Study in Princeton.

Between November 1935 and 1939 he was an assistant of David Hilbert in Göttingen. Gentzen joined the Nazi Party in 1937. In April 1939 Gentzen swore the oath of loyalty to Adolf Hitler as part of his academic appointment. From 1943 he was a teacher at the German Charles-Ferdinand University of Prague. Under a contract from the SS, Gentzen worked for the V-2 project.

Gentzen was arrested during the citizens uprising against the occupying German forces on 5 May 1945. He, along with the rest of the staff of the German University in Prague was subsequently handed over to Soviet forces. Because of his past association with the SA, NSDAP and NSD Dozentenbund, Gentzen was detained in a prison camp, where he died of starvation on 4 August 1945.

Work

Gentzen's main work was on the foundations of mathematics, in proof theory, specifically natural deduction and the sequent calculus. His cut-elimination theorem is the cornerstone of proof-theoretic semantics, and some philosophical remarks in his "Investigations into Logical Deduction", together with Ludwig Wittgenstein's later work, constitute the starting point for inferential role semantics.

One of Gentzen's papers had a second publication in the ideological Deutsche Mathematik that was founded by Ludwig Bieberbach who promoted "Aryan" mathematics.

Gentzen proved the consistency of the Peano axioms in a paper published in 1936. In his Habilitationsschrift, finished in 1939, he determined the proof-theoretical strength of Peano arithmetic. This was done by a direct proof of the unprovability of the principle of transfinite induction, used in his 1936 proof of consistency, within Peano arithmetic. The principle can, however, be expressed in arithmetic, so that a direct proof of Gödel's incompleteness theorem followed. Gödel used a coding procedure to construct an unprovable formula of arithmetic. Gentzen's proof was published in 1943 and marked the beginning of ordinal proof theory.

Publications
 
 
 
 
 
  (Lecture hold in Münster at the institute of Heinrich Scholz on 27 June 1936)

Posthumous
 
  – Published by Paul Bernays.
  – Published by Paul Bernays.

See also

Bertrand Russell

Notes

References
 - (English translation).

 - an English translation.

External links
 
 

1909 births
1945 deaths
People from Greifswald
University of Göttingen alumni
Nazi Party members
Academic staff of Charles University
20th-century German mathematicians
German logicians
People from the Province of Pomerania
20th-century German philosophers
Deaths by starvation
Nazis who died in prison custody
German people who died in Soviet detention